Celia Noemi Fiorotto (born 2 June 1992) is an Argentine basketball player for Quimsa and the Argentina women's national basketball team.

She defended Argentina at the 2018 FIBA Women's Basketball World Cup.

References

External links

1992 births
Living people
Argentine expatriate sportspeople in Ecuador
Argentine women's basketball players
Basketball players at the 2019 Pan American Games
Expatriate basketball people in Ecuador
Sportspeople from Entre Ríos Province
Power forwards (basketball)
Pan American Games competitors for Argentina